Rudolfsheim is a neighborhood of the district Rudolfsheim-Fünfhaus in Vienna, Austria.

References

Rudolfsheim-Fünfhaus
Katastralgemeinde of Vienna